Heart is the seventh studio album from Italian singer–songwriter Elisa.  It was released on 13 November 2009 in Italy. It has been described as a rock album, with alternative rock and electronic influences.

Commercial performance
The album became Elisa's first number-one studio album on the Italian FIMI Singles Chart, selling 50,000 copies in its first week. The Album also peaked at number 34 on the Global Albums Chart. "Heart" has sold 230,000 copies only in Italy where the album is 3× platinum.

Critical response

Heart received generally positive reviews from music critics, Rolling Stone's Emilio Cozzi gave Heart 4 out of 5 stars and commended Elisa: "It seems that Elisa's style has reached a balance between her instinctive expression and a lot of influences".

Track listing
All lyrics written by Elisa except where noted; all music composed by Elisa except where noted.

Release history

Chart performance

Certifications

References

2009 albums
Elisa (Italian singer) albums